= Aminata Dembélé Bagayoko =

Malian feminist

Aminata Dembélé Bagayoko is a Malian feminist. She is President of the Association pour la Formation Féminine et Appuis Communautaires (AFFAC) In 1996 she founded the school Promo-femme: Center of Audiovisual Education for Young Women, which has "changed the gender demographic of photographers working in Bamako".

Bagayako established Proto-femme as a private venture, helped by funding from the Canadian government.
